Helen Gallagher (born July 19, 1926) is an American actress, dancer, and singer. She is the recipient of three Emmy Awards, two Tony Awards, and a Drama Desk Award.

Early years
Born in Brooklyn, New York on July 19, 1926, Gallagher was raised in Scarsdale, New York, and the Bronx. Her parents separated and she was raised by an aunt. She suffered from asthma.

Career

Stage
Gallagher was known for decades as a Broadway performer. She appeared in Make a Wish, Hazel Flagg, Portofino, High Button Shoes, and Sweet Charity (for which she received a 1967 Tony Award nomination for Featured Actress in a Musical), eventually assuming the title role, and closing the original Broadway run. She also appeared in Cry for Us All.

In 1952, she won a Tony Award for her work in the revival of Pal Joey. In 1971, she won her second Tony  for her role in the revival of the musical No, No, Nanette. Her song-and-dance number with Bobby Van from that show, "You Can Dance with Any Girl", is preserved on youtube through its performance on the Tony Awards television broadcast. She later took on the role of Sue Smith in the Papermill Playhouse revival of the show, playing the role Keeler played a quarter century earlier.

Her first starring role on Broadway came in 1953 as title character in Hazel Flagg, based on the 1937 Carole Lombard movie Nothing Sacred. The role earned her a feature-photo shoot for Life. Gallagher appeared in the 1977 movie Roseland opposite Christopher Walken. An aficionada of Rodgers and Hammerstein, she appeared on a special tribute to Richard Rodgers on The Bell Telephone Hour.

Television
In 1949 Gallagher was co-host of Manhattan Showcase, a 15-minute talent-discovery program on CBS television.

Despite extensive work on Broadway, she is perhaps best known as matriarch Maeve Ryan on Ryan's Hope, a role she played for the show's entire duration, from 1975 to 1989. She was nominated for five Daytime Emmy Awards for her work on the serial, winning in 1976, 1977, and 1988. 

At the time she was cast in Ryan's Hope, Gallagher taught singing in her home three times a week. Michael Hawkins, who played the first Frank Ryan, was one of her students.

As the show progressed into the 1980s, the ratings took a steep slide. When ABC executives cancelled Ryan's Hope, Claire Labine ended the final episode with Maeve at the family bar, singing "Danny Boy". Almost immediately after the cancellation of Ryan's Hope, Gallagher had a two-day guest stint on Another World, and has appeared in All My Children as a strict nurse and on One Life to Live as a sex therapist (whose son married Dr. Dorian Lord). She has continued to act in various off-Broadway and professional theater productions.

Later years
In 1984, Gallagher starred in the title role of Tallulah, a musical stage biography of actress Tallulah Bankhead. In 1990s, she guest-starred on Law & Order and The Cosby Mysteries. In 1997, she starred in the independent LGBT-themed drama film Neptune’s Rocking Horse.

She is currently a faculty member at Herbert Berghof Studio in New York City.

Theater credits

Film and television

References

External links
 
 
 
 Helen Gallagher at Broadway World
 2003 interview on TheaterMania
 2019 interview about High Button Shoes on the New York City Center blog

1926 births
Living people
20th-century American actresses
21st-century American actresses
Actresses from New York City
American musical theatre actresses
American film actresses
American soap opera actresses
Donaldson Award winners
Tony Award winners
Daytime Emmy Award winners
Daytime Emmy Award for Outstanding Lead Actress in a Drama Series winners
People from Scarsdale, New York
People from Brooklyn
People from the Bronx